Velvet is an Australian musical partly based on New York's Studio 54. It debuted at the Adelaide Fringe Festival in 2015. It features a mix of music and acrobatics.

The musical was directed by Craig Ilott and was based on a concept created by Marcia Hines, Peter Rix and Craig Ilott.

The show has been performed in Edinburgh, Brisbane, Sydney, Melbourne, Adelaide Perth, Hobart and New Zealand.

An Original Cast Recording album was released and was nominated for the 2016 ARIA Award for Best Original Soundtrack, Cast or Show Album.

References

Australian musicals
2015 musicals